The Carlingue (or French Gestapo) were French auxiliaries who worked for the Gestapo, Sicherheitsdienst and Geheime Feldpolizei during the German occupation of France in the Second World War. 

The group, which was based at 93 rue Lauriston in the 16th arrondissement of Paris, was active between 1941 and 1944. It was initiated by Pierre Bonny (1895..1944), a corrupt ex-policeman. Later it was managed jointly by Henri Lafont and Pierre Loutrel, two professional criminals who had been active in the French underworld before the war.

Names
Carlingue  in French means the cabin (or central body of an aircraft). The unit used this as a euphemistic nickname to indicate it was an organisation with structure and strength. The group was also known externally as the Bonny-Lafont gang, after Pierre Bonny and Henri Lafont.

The Reich Security Main Office (RSHA) officially referred to the Carlingue as Active Group Hesse after the SS officer "who'd looked after its foundation". It was also known as the Gestapo française or the Bande de la Rue Lauriston.

History
The unit was formed in 1941 by the RSHA. Its purpose was to perform counterinsurgency operations against the Maquis in occupied France and the Vichy Regime. The Carlingue recruited its members from the same criminal milieu as that of its founders. Both Henri Lafont and Pierre Loutrel (alias Pierrot le fou (Crazy Pete)) were gangsters in the Parisian underworld before the war. Another member, an ex-police officer named Pierre Bonny, had been wanted by the French authorities for misappropriation of funds and selling influence in the Seznec and Stavisky Affairs. 

Many others of the Carlingue were from the disbanded North African Brigades. The partly criminal nature of the organisation gave it access to contacts such as informers, corrupt officials, and disreputable businesspeople such as Joseph Joanovici. Members were also active in the black market.

According to retired policeman Henri Longuechaud, "one might be scandalised by the numbers of 30,000 to 32,000 sometimes quoted [as members of the Carlingue]. In Paris, when the Germans launched a recruitment drive for 2,000 auxiliary policeman in their service, they received no fewer than 6,000 candidates." During the war, infamous French doctor and serial killer Marcel Petiot allegedly associated with Carlingue. His house was located in the same street as the Carlingue headquarters and he allegedly sometimes helped the group dispose of their victims' bodies. 

During January and February 1944, the Carlingue, as members of the paramilitary Légion Nord-Africaine (LNA) commanded by Alexandre Villaplane, wore German uniforms as part of Bandenbekämpfung operations against the French Resistance in the area around Tulle, in central France.

After the liberation of France in 1944, members of the Carlingue went into hiding. Many were caught, tried and condemned to death; some evaded arrest. One former Carlingue agent, Georges Boucheseiche, who died in Morocco in 1967, was employed by Service de Documentation Extérieure et de Contre-Espionnage, France's postwar external intelligence agency.

In August 2014, the government of Paris ordered the current owners of 93 rue Lauriston to restore the memorial plaque to the former headquarters of the Carlingue.

Notable members
Georges Pujol, a former resistance fighter who became a double agent for the Gestapo, arrested in August 1944 and shot.
Henri Lafont, executed at Fort Montrouge 26 December 1944
Alexandre Villaplane executed at Fort Montrouge 27 December 1944.
Clairé, executed at Fort Montrouge 27 December 1944.
Engel, executed at Fort Montrouge 27 December 1944.
Hare, executed at Fort Montrouge 27 December 1944.
Louis "Eddy" Pagnon, a member of the North African Brigade, executed at Fort Montrouge on 27 December 1944.
Pierre Bonny, sentenced to death and shot 29 December 1944.
Charles Delval, executed in the courtyard of the Fresnes prison in February 1945.
Ganioles executed at Fort Montrouge 24 June 1946.
Jourdan executed at Fort Montrouge 13 July 1946.
Marcel Buat, sentenced to death in June 1946 and executed at Versailles 12 August 1946.
Pierre Loutrel, died on 6 November 1946, five days after being shot in the bladder during a robbery at a Parisian jewellery store on avenue Kléber.
Bernard Fallot, executed at Fort Montrouge on 1 October 1947.
Maurice Bay, executed on 5 May 1950.
Abel Danos , shot 13 March 1952.
Raymond Monange, an officer from the North African Brigade, shot on 13 March 1952 at Fort Montrouge.
Auguste Ricord (1911–1985) tried postwar in absentia for collaboration; served a 10-year sentence 1972–1982 for drug smuggling but not retried for war crimes.

Media portrayals
Louis Malle's 1974 movie Lacombe, Lucien features characters based on the Bonny-LaFont gang.
In 2004, a made-for-television movie was produced about the Carlingue, entitled 93, rue Lauriston.  Although fictional, it was inspired by historic events and featured Lafont and Bonny as characters of the time.
Patrick Modiano, French winner of the 2014 Nobel Prize for literature, has written several novels set in occupied Paris during the war years, mysteries of memory and alienation related to his exploration of his own father's activities as a black marketeer.<ref name="nytimes">Alan Riding, "In Search of the Irrevocable", New York Times, December 2014</ref>The King of Nazi Paris by Christopher Othen, 2020  is a non-fiction history of the group.
The Carlingue and its leaders frequently appear in the Kohler & St. Cyr mystery novels of J. Robert Janes.

See also 
Geheime Feldpolizei - the secret military police of the Wehrmacht'' in France.
84 Avenue Foch - Parisian headquarters of the Sicherheitsdienst.
Special Brigades - a unit from the French police that specialized in fighting the French Resistance.
Milice - a paramilitary force raised by Vichy France.
Bezen Perrot - a comparable Breton nationalist formation

References

Vichy France
French collaboration during World War II
Gestapo
16th arrondissement of Paris
Reich Security Main Office